The Science Diplomats Club (SDC) is a social club that was founded in Washington, D.C. in 1965. The membership includes Science and Technology counselors, attachés, or representatives of research institutions from more than 40 Washington-based embassies, about half of them from Europe. In addition, a few former science counselors, as well as some U.S. personalities, have been granted the status of SDC honorary members.

Mission 
The principal purpose of SDC is:
"to provide an informal meeting place and networking channel for the Science Diplomats. Newcomers quickly find a group of colleagues with whom they can meet and 'learn the ropes' of the Washington science scene. Second, SDC offers a meeting forum where, on almost monthly basis, we get together to receive briefings on central science and technology issues of the day. Such encounters are useful in that they provide highly relevant information and insights on central matters, through discussion sessions with people from one of the many think tanks in Washington, with representatives from NIH, NSF, AAAS, the National Academies, NOAA or NIST. Also, dialogues with representatives from universities or various federal departments on pertinent issues of clear international relevance and consequence. ... SDC is thus a useful and dynamic two-way information and communications forum, benefiting the members and those science, technology and higher education stakeholders in Greater Washington wishing to stay in touch with the international science community. We are open to new suggestions and ideas on how to become an even more attractive and internationally oriented knowledge-promoting networking instrument".

History 

The Science Diplomats Club was established during a lunch held by the Embassy of Denmark at the Cosmos Club in January 1965. The club was the initial site for luncheons; when the Embassy of the Netherlands took over the secretariat, luncheons were also held at their embassy and other local restaurants. Starting in 1988, various science counselors started hosting luncheons either at their embassies, Meridian House, scientific/technical organizations, and, later on again, at the Cosmos Club.

During these luncheons, guest speakers from the government, associations, universities, and industries informed SDC members about developments in science and technology policy and on progress in R&D. In recent years, the club has also made visits to S&T organizations inside and outside the Washington area. In 2007 the Embassy of France began organizing "Science Breakfasts", which take place eight to ten times a year.

Apart from attending monthly luncheons and site visits, members are also invited to attend meetings at scientific and technical institutions, such as the National Academy of Sciences, National Institutes of Standards and Technology, etc.

The following persons have been chair of the SDC:

Activities 
As a social club, the SDC  organizes social activities (e.g. summer and winter parties). However, it also organizes meetings with American personalities in the domain of science and diplomacy, encounters with US science advisers, international bodies, and think tanks. Nowadays, such meetings are organized on a more regular basis (the Science Breakfasts). The SDC also organizes external activities to visit science centers or technology parks, jointly with agencies or diplomacy related associations, and participates in co-sponsoring events related to science diplomacy.

Science Breakfasts 
Since January 2007, together with the SDC, the Office of Science and Technology of the Embassy of France organizes monthly "Science Breakfasts", inviting a prominent member of the American science and technology community to speak to an audience of counselors from embassies in Washington. Since the first session, in January 2007, 30 to 40 guests from 15 to 20 different countries, have had an occasion to strengthen ties with American leaders in science and technology and to ask them questions and spur dialog within a favorable context.

See also 
 List of diplomatic missions in Washington, D.C.

References

External links 
 
 Science Breakfasts

Scientific organizations based in the United States
Organizations established in 1965